R.O.A.D. Entertainment is a British multinational entertainment company headquartered in London, UK with operations specialising in the Entertainment and Training sectors of music, television, publishing, telecommunications / Internet and video games industries.

History
2006, Chocolate Label an independent recording company was founded by Teriy Keys. In 2009 co-chief executive officer; Teriy Keys signed a joint venture incorporating global entertainment company, R.O.A.D. Group Global. (see acronym: Righteous Organised Always Determined)

R.O.A.D. Group is primarily made up of three core subsidiaries – R.O.A.D. Music & Management, R.O.A.D. Media Television and R.O.A.D. Academy CIC.

R.O.A.D. Academy is a registered CIC Community Interest Company which works with NEETs which is a government acronym for people currently "not in education, employment, or training" targeting people aged between 16 and 24. He also currently serves as the Academic administration of R.O.A.D. Academy CIC PLC.

R.O.A.D. Academy win award for 'Outstanding Contribution to Arts and the Community' at Greater London Authority event present but the Mayor of Haringey Mayor Councillor Kaushika Amin

Artists

Signed artists

Releases

Studio album

References 

British record labels
American record labels
Music publishing companies of the United Kingdom
Record labels established in 2009
Sony Music